The following is a list of National Pro Fastpitch players who have been selected for the All-NPF Team at least once in their careers.  Each year's All-NPF Team recognizes players for excellence on the field during the season. Since 2006, the All-NPF Team has been selected by the league and announced during the awards banquet after the end of the regular season.  In 2019, a player is named at each fielding position, four pitchers, a designated player, and five 'At-Large' selections. (Multiple players are selected if there is a tie in voting.)

From 2003–2005, NPF players were named to an All-Star teams and played All-Star games, in various formats.

The list below includes selections to those All-Star teams for 2003–2005.  In 2008 "Team NPF" played exhibition games against the 2008 United States women's national softball team
These "Team NPF" selections are NOT included below; 2008 includes only those named to the 2008 All-NPF Team.

As of the conclusion of 2019, Kelly Kretschman holds the record for most times named to the All-NPF Team (9).  Monica Abbott holds the record for most consecutive times named All-NPF (8 times).

Notes and references

External links

See also

 List of professional sports leagues
 List of professional sports teams in the United States and Canada

National Pro Fastpitch
Softball in the United States